Andrew Greig (born 23 September 1951) is a Scottish writer. He was born in Bannockburn, near Stirling, and grew up in Anstruther, Fife. He studied philosophy at the University of Edinburgh and is a former Glasgow University Writing Fellow and Scottish Arts Council Scottish/Canadian Exchange Fellow. He lives in Orkney and Edinburgh and is married to author Lesley Glaister.

Awards
He won an Eric Gregory Award in 1972. In 1985, Greig published an account of the successful ascent of the Muztagh Tower in the Himalayas. Summit Fever: The Story of an Armchair Climber  was shortlisted for the 1996 Boardman Tasker Prize for Mountain Literature.

His first novel, Electric Brae: A Modern Romance (1992), was shortlisted for the McVitie's Prize for Scottish Writer of the Year. His next novel, The Return of John MacNab (1996) was shortlisted for the Romantic Novelists' Association Award. His fifth novel, In Another Light (2004), won the 2004 Saltire Society Scottish Book of the Year Award. Fair Helen was shortlisted for the Walter Scott Prize (2014).

Published work

Poetry
White Boats (with Catherine Czerkawska) (1973)
Men On Ice (Canongate 1977)
Surviving Passages (Canongate 1982)
A Flame in your Heart (with Kathleen Jamie) (Bloodaxe 1987)
The Order of the Day (Bloodaxe 1989)
Western Swing (Bloodaxe c. 1993)
Into You (Bloodaxe 2000)
This Life, This Life (new and Selected Poems) (Bloodaxe 2006)
Getting Higher: The Complete Mountain Poems (Birlinn 2011)

Climbing
Men on Ice (1977)
Summit Fever: The Story of an Armchair Climber (1985)
Kingdoms of Experience: Everest, the Unclimbed Ridge (1986)
The Order of the Day (1990)

Non-Fiction
Preferred Lies: A Journey to the Heart of Scottish Golf (2006)
At the Loch of the Green Corrie (2010)

Fiction
Electric Brae: A Modern Romance (1992)
The Return of John MacNab (1996)
When They Lay Bare (1999)
That Summer (2000) (published as The Clouds Above : A Novel of Love and War in some markets)
In Another Light (2004)
Romanno Bridge (2008)
Fair Helen (2013)
Rose Nicolson (2021)

Articles
A White Elephant in Anstruther, in Lindsay, Maurice (ed.), The Scottish Review: Arts and Environment 32, November 1983,

References

External links
 Andrew Greig's website
 BAC entry
 Interview with Andrew Greig (2 Dec 2010)

Further reading
 Rush, Christopher (1983), Elephants in Anstruther: In Search of the Scottish Identity, in Lindsay, Maurice (ed.), The Scottish Review: Arts and Environment 31, August 1983, pp. 43 – 48, 
 Scott, Alexander (1984), Pink Elephants in Anstruther: Scottish Identity, in Lindsay, Maurice (ed.), The Scottish Review: Arts and Environment 33, February 1984, pp. 3 – 8, 

1951 births
Living people
People associated with Orkney
People from Anstruther
Alumni of the University of Edinburgh